The Grand Carver of England is an hereditary office in the Royal Household of the sovereign of England, then Great Britain, and later the United Kingdom, held in gross.

Role
The Grand Carver is charged with carving the Monarch's meat during official and royal dinners.

Officers
The Earl of Denbigh and Desmond currently serves as Grand Carver.

See also
 Great Officers of State

References

Positions within the British Royal Household
Ceremonial officers in the United Kingdom